Richard Finglas (died 1574) was an Irish barrister and Law Officer of the sixteenth century.

He belonged to the prominent Finglas family of Westphailstown (or Westpalstown), County Dublin, and must therefore have been a close relative, probably a nephew or grandson, of Patrick Finglas, Lord Chief Justice of Ireland, who died in 1537.

He was appointed Principal Solicitor for Ireland in 1550, and his tenure in that office was renewed by patent in 1561. As Principal Solicitor, he served as deputy to the Solicitor General for Ireland. He was appointed Serjeant-at-law (Ireland) in 1554. Some sources state that he was appointed Solicitor General in the same year, but this may simply reflect the confusion between the two similarly named offices of Solicitor General and Principal Solicitor. He played a part in the development of the King's Inns  as Ireland's first law school, and is listed as one of the lessees of the building which housed the Inns at Blackfriars (modern  Henrietta  Street) in the 1567 lease from the English Crown. He sat on a number of Crown commissions, including one in 1559 for assessing the inhabitants of Dublin for taxation, and two for mustering the available troops in the Pale. He sat on a commission of gaol delivery in Westmeath and Kildare in 1553-4.

As Queen's Serjeant he earned high praise from the Irish Government for his devotion to duty: he was awarded a special annuity of £10 for his "labour and diligence" in attending the Court of Castle Chamber (the Irish version of Star Chamber) and the Privy Council of Ireland; this seems to have been a special reward over and above the normal fees for  his office.

Despite his obvious legal ability, and the praise for his diligence, he never became a High Court judge: this probably reflected the low opinion which Queen Elizabeth I had of her Irish Law Officers, whom she generally refused to promote to the judiciary, and whom wherever a vacancy arose she replaced if possible with an English lawyer.

He died, still in office, in 1574.

Sources
Hart, A. R. History of the King's Serjeant at law in Ireland Four Courts Press Dublin 2000
Kenny, Colum  King's Inns and the Kingdom of Ireland  Irish Academic Press Dublin 1992
Morrin, James Calendar of the  Patent and Close  Rolls of Chancery in Ireland in the reigns of Henry VIII, Edward VI,  Mary and Elizabeth  Alexander Thom and Co. Dublin 1861
Smyth, Constantine Joseph  Chronicle of the Law Officers of Ireland Butterworths London 1839

Notes

Serjeants-at-law (Ireland)
People from County Dublin
Year of birth missing
1574 deaths